Markus Nutivaara (born 6 June 1994) is a Finnish professional ice hockey defenceman currently playing with the San Jose Sharks of the National Hockey League (NHL). Nutivaara was selected by the Columbus Blue Jackets in the 7th round (189th overall) of the 2015 NHL Entry Draft.

Playing career
Nutivaara made his debut in Finland's top-division, Liiga, playing with Oulun Kärpät during the 2014–15 Liiga season. He helped win the 2015 Liiga title, making 35 appearances in regular season (zero goals, two assists) and 16 in post-season play (one goal, five assists). He also gained international experience competing in the Champions Hockey League with Kärpät, advancing to the semi-finals.

In 2015–16, Nutivaara saw the ice in 50 games during the Liiga regular season, chipping in with six goals, while dishing out 16 assists. He also played in seven playoff contests, recording one goal as well as four assists. In Champions Hockey League play, Nutivaara had 13 appearances, scoring four goals and assisting on five more on the way to the championship game, where Kärpät fell short to Swedish Frölunda HC.

He put pen to paper on a two-year entry level contract with the Columbus Blue Jackets of the National Hockey League (NHL) in May 2016. During the 2016–17 season, he scored his first NHL goal on 12 November 2016, against the St. Louis Blues to help clinch an 8–4 victory.

On 30 March 2018, Nutivaara was signed to a four-year, $10.8 million contract extension to remain with the Blue Jackets.

On 8 October 2020, Nutivaara ended his tenure with the Blue Jackets after four seasons when he was traded to the Florida Panthers in exchange for Cliff Pu.

After he was limited to just 1 game during  season due to injury, Nutivaara left the Panthers as a free agent and was signed to a one-year, $1.75 million contract with the San Jose Sharks on 13 July 2022.

International play
He made his debut with the Finnish national team at the 2015 Channel One Cup in Prague and Moscow. On 30 April 2018, Nutivaara was selected to participate in his first IIHF sanctioned event for Finland at the 2018 World Championships in Denmark.

Career statistics

Regular season and playoffs

International

References

External links

1994 births
Living people
Cleveland Monsters players
Columbus Blue Jackets draft picks
Columbus Blue Jackets players
Finnish expatriate ice hockey players in the United States
Finnish ice hockey defencemen
Florida Panthers players
Hokki players
Jokipojat players
Oulun Kärpät players
Sportspeople from Oulu